The Sly Old Cat is a children's book written and illustrated by Beatrix Potter in 1906, and first published by Frederick Warne & Co. in 1971, almost thirty years after her death. The story tells of a cat who invites a rat to a tea party with the intention of eating him, but the rat outwits her and leaves the party with a muffin in a paper bag.

Critical commentary
The Sly Old Cat is told mainly in monosyllables, and is critically considered "perfect in its fusion of word and picture, and visually reminiscent of Randolph Caldecott in its rhythmic narrative flow."

References
Footnotes

Works cited

 
 
 

1906 children's books
Books by Beatrix Potter
Books about cats
Frederick Warne & Co books
Picture books by Beatrix Potter
Books published posthumously
British children's books